5th SLGFCA Awards
December 15, 2008

Best Film: 
The Curious Case of Benjamin Button

Best Director: 
Danny Boyle
Slumdog Millionaire
The 5th St. Louis Gateway Film Critics Association Awards were awarded on December 15, 2008.

Winners and nominees

Best Actor
Sean Penn – Milk as Harvey Milk
Frank Langella – Frost/Nixon
Richard Jenkins – The Visitor
Mickey Rourke – The Wrestler
Leonardo DiCaprio – Revolutionary Road

Best Actress
Kate Winslet – Revolutionary Road as April Wheeler and The Reader as Hanna Schmidtz
Angelina Jolie – Changeling
Cate Blanchett – The Curious Case of Benjamin Button
Anne Hathaway – Rachel Getting Married

Best Animated Film
WALL-E
Kung Fu Panda
Madagascar: Escape 2 Africa
Bolt
Chicago 10
Waltz With Bashir

Best cinematography
Australia – Mandy Walker
The Curious Case of Benjamin Button – Claudio Miranda
The Dark Knight – Wally Pfister
Revolutionary Road – Roger Deakins
Slumdog Millionaire – Anthony Dod Mantle
Milk – Harris Savides

Best Director
Danny Boyle – Slumdog Millionaire
Ron Howard – Frost/Nixon
David Fincher – The Curious Case of BenjaminButton
Gus Van Sant – Milk
Christopher Nolan – The Dark Knight

Best Documentary Film
Man on Wire
Body of War
Pray the Devil Back to Hell
Shine a Light
Standard Operating Procedure

Best Film
The Curious Case of Benjamin Button
Milk
Slumdog Millionaire
The Dark Knight
Frost/Nixon

Best Film – Comedy
Burn After Reading
Zack and Miri Make a Porno
Tropic Thunder
Forgetting Sarah Marshall
Role Models

Best Foreign Language Film
Slumdog Millionaire • India/UK/United States
Let the Right One In • Sweden
The Class • France
I've Loved You So Long • France
Tell No One • France

Best Music
The Visitor
Gran Torino
WALL-E
Cadillac Records
The Dark Knight

Best Screenplay
Frost/Nixon – Peter Morgan
The Curious Case of Benjamin Button – Eric Roth and Robin Swicord
Gran Torino – Nick Schenk
Slumdog Millionaire – Simon Beaufoy
Milk – Dustin Lance Black

Best Supporting Actor
Heath Ledger – The Dark Knight as The Joker posthumous win
Josh Brolin – Milk
Robert Downey Jr. – Tropic Thunder
Michael Shannon – Revolutionary Road
Jeffrey Wright – Cadillac Records
John Malkovich – Burn After Reading

Best Supporting Actress
Viola Davis – Doubt as Mrs. Miller
Taraji P. Henson – The Curious Case of Benjamin Button
Penélope Cruz – Vicky Cristina Barcelona
Marisa Tomei – The Wrestler
Frances McDormand – Burn After Reading
Amy Adams – Doubt

Best Visual Effects
The Dark Knight
The Curious Case of Benjamin Button
Iron Man
Speed Racer
WALL-E
Synecdoche, New York

Most Original, Innovative or Creative Film
The Curious Case of Benjamin Button
Wall-E
Speed Racer
Waltz With Bashir
Slumdog Millionaire
Synecdoche, New York

2008
2008 film awards
2008 in Missouri
St Louis